Pia Zebadiah Bernadet (born 22 January 1989) is an Indonesian badminton player. She is the sister of men's doubles world and Olympic champion Markis Kido.

Career

Women's singles 
In 2007, Zebadiah contributed to the Indonesian women's team's capture of the gold medal at the Southeast Asian Games by beating Singapore's Gu Juan 21–15, 17–21, 21–12 in the decisive match.

Perhaps her best performance came in the 2008 Uber Cup. She helped Indonesia to defeat Germany in the semifinals by dominating Karin Schnaase 21–7, 21–15.

She played in the 2008 Indonesia, Japan, and Denmark Superseries, advancing farthest in Denmark where she reached the quarterfinals.

Another good performance came at the Chinese Taipei Open, where she defeated her compatriot Maria Kristin Yulianti, who won the bronze medal at the 2008 Olympic Games, in the quarter-final. However, she lost to the young star from India, Saina Nehwal, in the semifinals.

Women's doubles 
Pia Zebadiah plays in the women's doubles with Rizki Amelia Pradipta. Previously, she played with Debby Susanto, but they were often defeated in the earlier rounds of a tournament. Because she couldn't play well in several tournaments in the women's doubles discipline, she broke her partnership with Susanto. In 2011, Zebadiah decided to be a professional player along with her brother Kido, rather than be in the national training center. After becoming a professional player, she became partners with Pradipta. Together they achieved better results in women's doubles. In 2012, she with Pradipta won Chinese Taipei Open, and in 2013, they won the Malaysia Grand Prix Gold.

Mixed doubles 
Pia Zebadiah played in the mixed doubles with Fran Kurniawan. She always appeared confident, and very lissom. In 2009, Zebadiah took the first title from New Zealand Open and defeated World number 10 Yohan Hadikusumo Wiratama and Chau Hoi Wah from Hong Kong. In 2010, they reached the semi-finals in the Indonesia Grand Prix Gold, but were defeated by Tontowi Ahmad and Liliyana Natsir. In 2011, they could reach their first final in the Superseries event at the India Open, but they were once again defeated by Ahmad and Natsir with just straight sets of 18–21 and 21–23. They became the main pair of mixed doubles in the Sudirman Cup due to Natsir injury.

Personal life 
Zebadiah started playing badminton in Jaya Raya Jakarta badminton club. Her parents are Djumharbey Anwar (father) and Yul Asteria Zakaria (mother). In her spare time she plays football. Her brothers, Bona Septano, and Markis Kido, are also Indonesian national badminton players.

Achievements

BWF World Junior Championships 
Girls' doubles

Asian Junior Championships 
Mixed doubles

BWF Superseries (1 runner-up) 
The BWF Superseries, which was launched on 14 December 2006 and implemented in 2007, was a series of elite badminton tournaments, sanctioned by the Badminton World Federation (BWF). BWF Superseries levels were Superseries and Superseries Premier. A season of Superseries consisted of twelve tournaments around the world that had been introduced since 2011. Successful players were invited to the Superseries Finals, which were held at the end of each year.

Mixed doubles

  Superseries Finals Tournament
  Superseries Premier Tournament
  Superseries Tournament

BWF Grand Prix (6 titles) 
The BWF Grand Prix had two levels, the Grand Prix and Grand Prix Gold. It was a series of badminton tournaments sanctioned by the Badminton World Federation (BWF) and played between 2007 and 2017.

Women's doubles

Mixed doubles

  Grand Prix Gold tournament
  Grand Prix tournament

International Challenge/Series/Satellite (9 titles, 4 runners-up) 
Women's singles

Women's doubles

Mixed doubles

  BWF International Challenge tournament
  BWF International Series tournament

Performance timeline

National team 
 Junior level

 Senior level

Individual competitions 
 Junior level

 Senior level

References

External links 

 

1989 births
Living people
Sportspeople from Medan
Indonesian female badminton players
Badminton players at the 2006 Asian Games
Badminton players at the 2010 Asian Games
Asian Games bronze medalists for Indonesia
Asian Games medalists in badminton
Medalists at the 2010 Asian Games
Competitors at the 2007 Southeast Asian Games
Southeast Asian Games gold medalists for Indonesia
Southeast Asian Games medalists in badminton
Universiade bronze medalists for Indonesia
Universiade medalists in badminton
Medalists at the 2007 Summer Universiade